Kade Murray Harvey (born 7 October 1975) is a former Australian cricketer who played first-class cricket for Western Australia. He was an all-rounder who bowled right-arm medium and batted in the lower order. Outside of cricket he is a qualified pharmacist.

Having represented Western Australia at under-17 level and under-19, Harvey was invited to join the Australian Cricket Academy. He went on to play a couple of games for the national Under-19s team in a game against an Indian youth side in early 1995.

Later that year he made his debut for Western Australia, playing first-class and limited overs matches for them. He soon became earmarked as a specialist one-day player and won the "Best New Talent" award after the Mercantile Mutual Cup season of 1996–97. He had taken 18 one day domestic wickets that season which equaled the competition record.  He won the man of the match award in the final of the 2003–04 ING Cup, taking 4 wickets for 28 runs and scoring 53 runs from 42 balls in a 75 run unbeaten partnership with Darren Wates to win the game for the Western Australia.

He made just the one first class hundred, an innings of 100 not out against Tasmania at Bellerive Oval in 2004.

References

External links

1975 births
Australian cricketers
Living people
Western Australia cricketers
Cricketers from Perth, Western Australia